is an egg custard dish in Japanese cuisine. Unlike many other custards, it is usually eaten as a dish in a meal, as chawanmushi contains savory rather than sweet ingredients. The custard consists of an egg mixture flavored with soy sauce, dashi, and mirin, with numerous ingredients such as shiitake mushrooms, kamaboko, yuri-ne (lily root), ginkgo and boiled shrimp placed into a tea-cup-like container.  The recipe for the dish is similar to that of Chinese steamed eggs, but the toppings often differ. Since egg custards cannot be picked up by chopsticks, it is one of the few Japanese dishes that is eaten with a spoon.

Chawanmushi can be eaten either hot or cool. When udon is added as an ingredient, it is called odamaki mushi or odamaki udon.

See also 
 Chinese steamed eggs
 Gyeran jjim
 List of hors d'oeuvre
 List of steamed foods

References

External link

Appetizers
Japanese egg dishes
Steamed foods